WTLV (channel 12) is a television station in Jacksonville, Florida, United States, affiliated with NBC. It is owned by Tegna Inc. alongside Orange Park–licensed ABC affiliate WJXX (channel 25). Both stations share studios on East Adams Street (near TIAA Bank Field) in downtown Jacksonville, while WTLV's transmitter is located on Anders Boulevard in the city's Killarney Shores section.

History

The station first signed on the air on September 1, 1957, as WFGA-TV (which stood for "We're Florida and Georgia"). Founded by the Florida-Georgia Television Company, it was originally a primary NBC affiliate with a secondary affiliation with ABC. It was the first television station in the United States that was designed for color broadcasting, and many of the country's color commercials were filmed at the station. Two years later, WFGA donated tower space, money and transmitting facilities to the market's National Educational Television (NET) member station WJCT (channel 7, now a PBS member station). In 1958, WFGA was selected "Newsfilm Station of the Year" by the National Press Photographers Association.

On October 11, 1958, channel 12 became the first television station to air a live launch from Cape Canaveral – Thor-Able's successful launch of the Pioneer I lunar probe. The station also provided the remote facilities, and supplied video and audio for all three major networks (ABC, NBC and CBS). This earned WFGA-TV the exclusive spot for NBC's space coverage. WFGA lost the ABC affiliation to WJKS (channel 17, later WJWB and now CW affiliate WCWJ), when it signed on in September 1966; as a result, channel 12 became an exclusive NBC affiliate.

On December 16, 1971, the station changed its call letters to WTLV. In 1975, the station was purchased by Harte-Hanks Communications. On March 31, 1980, WTLV swapped affiliations with WJKS, joining ABC, which at the time was the most-watched of the then-three major U.S. broadcast television networks. In December 1987, the Gannett Company bought WTLV from Harte-Hanks, in a two-station deal with Greensboro, North Carolina, sister station WFMY-TV. The deal was finalized in February 1988. On April 3 of that year, WTLV reversed the 1980 affiliation swap with WJKS, returning to NBC in what the network called one of its most successful affiliation switches ever. By this time, NBC had once again become the highest-rated broadcast network. This swap brought WTLV in line with sister stations WXIA-TV in Atlanta, KARE-TV in Minneapolis–Saint Paul and KPNX in Phoenix, which had recently renewed their NBC relationships.

Duopoly with WJXX
After the Federal Communications Commission (FCC) legalized television station duopolies on November 15, 1999, the Allbritton Communications Company announced the following day that it would sell ABC affiliate WJXX (channel 25) to Gannett, creating a duopoly with WTLV. Normally, duopolies between two "big four" affiliates or even "big three" affiliates would not be allowed because they usually constituted the top four stations in a market. FCC regulations do not allow common ownership of any two of the four highest-rated stations in a market based on total-day viewership. However, WJXX had ranked as the fifth highest-rated station in the market, often trailing WJWB (which had gone from one of ABC's weakest affiliates to becoming one of The WB's strongest) and Fox affiliate WAWS (channel 30, now WFOX-TV), in addition to WJXT and WTLV. Once the sale was finalized on March 17, 2000, Gannett's purchase of WJXX became the first instance where a single company owned two television stations that both had affiliations with a "big three" television network (all of Jacksonville's "big four" network affiliates ended up under the control of two media companies by 2002), when WJAX (then WTEV-TV)—which is operated alongside Cox Media Group's WFOX—replaced WJXT as the market's CBS affiliate.

As part of the purchase, the company integrated WJXX's operations into WTLV's Adams Street facility and launched a joint news operation known as First Coast News. However, most of the on-air personnel were holdovers from WTLV. The studios of the newly created duopoly were also renovated.

Around the first week of October 2012, Gannett entered a dispute against Dish Network regarding compensation fees and Dish's AutoHop commercial-skip feature on its Hopper digital video recorders. Gannett ordered that Dish discontinue AutoHop on the account that it was affecting advertising revenues for its Jacksonville television stations. Gannett threatened to pull them both from the satellite provider should the skirmish continue beyond October 7 and Dish and Gannett fail to reach an agreement. The two parties eventually reached an agreement after extending the deadline for a few hours.

On June 29, 2015, the Gannett Company split in two, with one side specializing in print media and the other side specializing in broadcast and digital media. WTLV and WJXX were retained by the latter company, named Tegna.

On May 30, 2017, WTLV was fined $55,000 by the FCC for airing Jacksonville Jaguars promos that included the Emergency Alert System tones.

News operation

When WFGA-TV began broadcasting, the station's first news director was Harold Baker, who had served in the same position at WSM radio and television in Nashville, Tennessee. Baker would anchor the station's 6 p.m. news for 17 years and direct the nascent channel 12 newsroom for 19 years in total, winning the station major national journalism awards. It settled in as a consistent second-place finisher to WJXT in local news, though it worked to close the gap, particularly after its acquisition by Gannett in 1988.

After being acquired by Harte-Hanks in 1975, WTLV began producing the market's first hour-long evening newscast, branded as Action News; channel 12 began producing Jacksonville's first midday newscast at noon soon afterwards. WTLV's Action News launched the city's first morning newscast, Good Morning Jacksonville, in the early 1980s. Some of the first shows featured Pamela Rittenhouse and current First Coast News chief meteorologist Tim Deegan. Beginning in 1995, WTLV also aired a weekly television show called Monday Night Live, which aired at 7:00 p.m. every Monday evening during the NFL season, and was hosted by sports director Dan Hicken and John Jurkovic.

Notable staff 

 Nick Gregory – meteorologist (early 1980s); now chief meteorologist at WNYW
 Curt Menefee – sports anchor (1991–1992); now co-host of Fox NFL Sunday
 Harmon Wages – sports anchor (late 1980s); retired

Technical information

Subchannels
The station's digital signal is multiplexed:

Digital subchannel 12.2 originally carried NBC Weather Plus until the network ceased operations in November 2008; branded as First Coast News Weather Plus, it subsequently became a locally originated weather channel as part of the NBC Plus automated weather service. In April 2009, WTLV moved First Coast News Weather Plus to WJXX on a newly created second digital subchannel of that station. WTLV then began carrying Universal Sports over digital subchannel 12.2, which was subsequently replaced with The Country Network (now ZUUS Country) in January 2012, after Universal Sports ended operations as a digital multicast network and transitioned to a digital cable and satellite network. In the fall of 2013, the subchannel became an affiliate of Soul of the South Network.

Analog-to-digital conversion
On June 12, 2009, WTLV terminated its analog signal, on VHF channel 12, as part of the federally mandated transition from analog to digital television. The station's digital signal remained on its pre-transition VHF channel 13. Through the use of PSIP, digital television receivers display WTLV's virtual channel as 12.

As part of the SAFER Act, WTLV kept its analog signal on the air until June 27 to inform viewers of the digital television transition through a loop of public service announcements from the National Association of Broadcasters.

References

External links
 
 Photos of WTLV's news set
 WFGA-TV Original Sign-On
 WTLV-TV Transmitter: 

NBC network affiliates
Tegna Inc.
Antenna TV affiliates
True Crime Network affiliates
Court TV affiliates
Comet (TV network) affiliates
Charge! (TV network) affiliates
Television channels and stations established in 1957
TLV
Wometco Enterprises
1957 establishments in Florida
Former Gannett subsidiaries